The Ogden A's were a minor league baseball team  in the Pacific Coast League, based in Ogden, Utah. They were the Triple-A farm club of the Oakland Athletics, and replaced the San Jose Missions as the tenth team in the PCL.

In 1979, hall of famer Rickey Henderson played in 71 games for the Ogden A's, until his major league debut in late June.

Purchased by Peter Pocklington, owner of the NHL's Edmonton Oilers, the club moved to Edmonton, Alberta, Canada, and were the Edmonton Trappers for 24 seasons (1981–2004). Nolan Ryan bought the team and moved it to Texas in 2005; now the Round Rock Express, they are based in Round Rock, a suburb north of Austin.

In Ogden, the A's played at John Affleck Park on South Wall Avenue, later demolished for commercial developments.

References

External links
Baseball Reference – Ogden, Utah
Digital Ballparks – John Affleck Park – Ogden, Utah

Baseball teams established in 1979
Sports clubs disestablished in 1980
Defunct Pacific Coast League teams
Defunct baseball teams in Utah
Oakland Athletics minor league affiliates
Sports in Ogden, Utah
Professional baseball teams in Utah
1979 establishments in Utah
1980 disestablishments in Utah
Baseball teams disestablished in 1980